The 2017 ICF Canoe Sprint World Championships, the 43rd edition of the World Championships, were held in Račice, Czech Republic, from 23 to 27 August 2017.

Explanation of events
Canoe sprint competitions are contested in either a Canadian canoe (C), an open canoe with a single-blade paddle, or in a kayak (K), a closed canoe with a double-bladed paddle. Each canoe or kayak can hold one person (1), two people (2), or four people (4). For each of the specific canoes or kayaks, such as a K-1 (kayak single), the competition distances can be 200, 500, 1000 or 5000 metres. When a competition is listed as a K-2 500m event, for example, it means two people are in a kayak competing over a distance of 500 metres.

Paracanoe competitions are contested in either a va'a (V), an outrigger canoe (which includes a second pontoon) with a single-blade paddle, or in a kayak (as above). All international competitions are held over 200 metres in single-man boats, with three event classes in both types of vessel for men and women depending on the level of an athlete's impairment. The lower the classification number, the more severe the impairment is – for example, VL1 is a va'a competition for those with particularly severe impairments.

Canoe sprint

Medal table

Men's events
 Non-Olympic classes

Canoe

Kayak

Women's events
 Non-Olympic classes

Canoe

Kayak

Medal reallocation

Paracanoe

Medal table

Medal events
 Non-Paralympic classes

Notes

References

External links
Official website
Official results site
Results book
International Canoe Federation

 
ICF Canoe Sprint World Championships
ICF Canoe Sprint World Championships
2017 ICF Canoe Sprint World Championships
2017 ICF Canoe Sprint World Championships
August 2017 sports events in Europe
ICF Canoe Sprint World Championships